Maman Abdurrahman (born 12 May 1982 in Jakarta, Indonesia) is an Indonesian professional footballer who plays as a defender for Liga 1 club Persija Jakarta.

Career

Youth career
He made his debut at PS PAM Jaya in the 1996–1998 season. Afterwards he played for Persijatim in the 1998–2000 season.

Senior career
He started his senior career in 2001 at Persijatim Solo FC, playing for three seasons (2001–2004) where he appear 13 times and scored 3 goals. In 2005, he signed for PSIS Semarang, playing for three seasons (2005–2008) as well. Scoring one goal in 34 appearances.

In 2008, he was signed by Persib Bandung and became the first squad.

In 2013, he signed a contract with Sriwijaya FC for short-time period. And in 2014, he was signed by Persita Tangerang to compete in Indonesian Premier League.

Finally in 2016, he was signed by Persija Jakarta to compete in unofficial national cup. As Liga 1 began, he became an important player of Persija.

In December 2019, Abdurrahman's contract was not renewed by Persija.

National team career 

2003: Pre Olympic
2004: Asian Cup, Pre World Cup
2005: SEA Games XXIII Philippines
2006: Brunei Merdeka Games, BV International Cup
2007: AFF Championship, Asian Cup

International career

Abdurrahman's international debut in the senior national team was at 2006 Brunei Merdeka Games against Malaysia on 23 August 2006; Indonesia drew 1–1. At Asian Cup 2007 he played 3 times; Indonesia win 2–1 from Bahrain, lose 1–2 from Saudi Arabia and lose 0–1 from South Korea at last game in group D. He was Indonesia captain for the match against Thailand in 2010 AFF Suzuki Cup.

Honours

Club

Persija Jakarta
 Liga 1: 2018
 Indonesia President's Cup: 2018
Menpora Cup: 2021

International 
Indonesia
AFF Championship runner-up: 2010

Individual honors
Liga Indonesia Best player: 2006

References

External links 
 
 

Indonesian footballers
2007 AFC Asian Cup players
1982 births
Living people
Betawi people
Persijatim players
Persija Jakarta players
Sriwijaya F.C. players
Persib Bandung players
PSIS Semarang players
Liga 1 (Indonesia) players
Sportspeople from Jakarta
Association football defenders
Indonesia international footballers